The 1st His Majesty's Life Guards Rifle Regiment was a regiment of the Russian Imperial Guard that existed from 1856 prior to being dissolved in 1918 after World War I and the Russian Revolution. It was part of the 1st Guards Infantry Division, which itself was part of the Guards Corps.

History
It was initially established on 27 March 1856 as the 1st His Majesty's Life Guards Rifle Battalion from several other regiments within the 1st Guards Infantry Division and the 2nd Guards Infantry Division, along with some other units. In 1863 the unit took part in quelling the Polish uprising and in 1870 became part of the newly formed Guards Rifle Brigade, under the command of Grand Duke Vladimir Alexandrovich. It later had the distinction of personally escorting Emperor Alexander II during the Russo-Turkish War of 1877-78. In 1910 it was raised from a battalion to a full regiment and in 1914, with the outbreak of World War I and the general mobilization, it received a reserve battalion. In 1917 it was renamed "1st Guards Rifle Regiment" and was completely dissolved in May 1918. Several of its members went on to fight in the White Army during the Russian Civil War. In 1951 an organization for veterans of the regiment was formed by some White émigrés.

Patron
The patron of the 1st His Majesty's Life Guards Rifle Regiment was the reigning emperor.
Alexander II (1856–1881)
Alexander III (1881–1894)
Nicholas II (1894–1917)

Commanders
The list of battalion and regimental commanders.
27.03.1856 — 09.06.1857 Colonel Count Alexander Stroganov 
30.08.1857 — 23.04.1861 Major General Duke Alexei Shakovsky 
23.04.1861 — 25.05.1863 Major General Duke Alexander Rebinder 
25.05.1863 — 27.11.1864 Major General Count Pavel Shuvalov 
27.11.1864 — 14.12.1868 Colonel (then Major General) Alexander Gelfreich 
14.12.1868 — 17.04.1874 Colonel Baron Karl-Vladimir Arpsgofen 
17.04.1874 — 17.10.1877 Colonel Mikhail Ebeling 
27.10.1877 — 12.02.1890 Colonel (then Major General) Georgy Vasmund
12.02.1890 — 17.02.1891 Major General Ivan Maltsov
17.02.1891 — 22.11.1893 Colonel Vladimir Glazov 
22.11.1893 — 28.11.1895 Major General Andrei Chekmarev 
28.11.1895 — 07.02.1901 Major General Alexander Ogaryov
06.10.1901 — 19.11.1905 Major General Duke Nikolai Trubetskoi
19.11.1905 — 04.12.1907 Major General Rozenshild von Paulin
04.12.1907 — 27.09.1914 Major General Pavel Nikolayev 
29.09.1914 — 07.02.1917 Major General Ernest Levstrem 
02.08.1917 — 27.10.1917 Colonel Sergei Kreiton 
29.10.1917 — 20.12.1917 Colonel Georgy Bernikovsky 
23.12.1917 — 01.03.1918 Colonel Kanushin

References

Former guards regiments
Military units and formations established in 1856
Military units and formations disestablished in 1918
Infantry regiments of the Russian Empire
Russian Imperial Guard
Saint Petersburg Governorate
Guards regiments of the Russian Empire